Reverend Aaron Burt Grosh (1803 – March 27, 1884), a Universalist minister, was one of the eight founders of the National Grange of the Order of Patrons of Husbandry, a fraternal organization in the United States. He had a major part in the design of the Grange ritual and was also responsible for the various songs used during various celebrations of the Grange.

Grosh accepted a position in the U.S. Department of Agriculture soon after its establishment, where he served as the first Department Librarian of the United States National Agricultural Library from 1867 until 1869.

He wrote a volume for members of the Grange to give them a better understanding of the organization and its teachings. He also wrote the Odd Fellows Improved Manual for the same purpose.

Legacy
The other founders of the Grange were Oliver Hudson Kelley, William Saunders, Francis M. McDowell, John Trimble, John R. Thompson, William M. Ireland and Caroline A. Hall.

The United States National Agricultural Library is located in Beltsville, Maryland.

The Aaron B. Grosh Mentoring Award is named for him.

References
 The Founders of the Grange

Notes

American librarians
1803 births
1884 deaths
Clergy of the Universalist Church of America
National Grange of the Order of Patrons of Husbandry
United States Department of Agriculture officials
United States National Agricultural Library
19th-century American clergy